Pakenham's Case, Y.B. 42 Ed. III 3, pl. 14, was an old English case that held that the owner of a manor could enforce a covenant that had been made with the previous owner of the manor.  The covenant was that a convent and prior would sing in the manor chapel every week.

References

Real property law
1360s in law
1369 in England